Joel Shubin (died March 24, 1942) was a Russian agronomist, journalist, and an alleged Communist International representative to the American Communist Party. At one time, he served as the Soviet Deputy Minister of Agriculture.

Biography
Born Jewish, Shubin edited the Moscow-based Peasant Gazette in the 1930s. A widower with a teenage daughter, he married the American journalist Anna Louise Strong without ceremony in 1931, and they remained married for the rest of his life. At the time, Strong edited the English-language version of another Soviet newspaper, Moscow News. While Shubin often accompanied Strong during her trips back to the United States, the two were often separated due to work commitments. According to Rewi Alley's account, Strong later said: "perhaps we married because we were both so doggone lonely...but we were very happy."

Shubin died of a lung disease under mysterious circumstances on March 24, 1942. Strong, who was working in California at the time, didn't learn of her husband's death until that August. It was reported in 1949 that an unnamed Soviet official suspected that Shubin was "liquidated."

References

Notes
See Judith Nies. Nine Women: Portraits from the American Radical Tradition, University of California Press, 2002,  p. 166
Claimed in the following non-peer reviewed publication: Herbert Romerstein, Eric Breindel. The Venona Secrets: Exposing Soviet Espionage and America's Traitors, Washington, DC, Regnery Publishing, Inc., 2000,  p. 71

Further reading
"Anna Louise Strong, American writer in China", in Notable Women of China: Shang Dynasty to the Early Twentieth Century. New York, M.E. Sharp, Inc, 2000  p379.
David Caute. The Fellow Travellers: Intellectual Friends of Communism, Yale University Press,  pp. 79–80

Russian journalists
Soviet journalists
Russian male journalists
Year of birth missing
1942 deaths
Russian Jews